Charles "Chuck" Walker professor of Latin American history at University of California, Davis. He is the director of its Hemispheric Institute on the Americas and director of Global Centers for Latin America & The Caribbean (Global Affairs). From 2015–2020 he held the MacArthur Foundation Endowed Chair in International Human Rights. His  interests include Peru, natural disasters, social movements, subaltern politics, truth commissions, and sports and empire.

Books 
In 1999, Walker published Smoldering Ashes: Cuzco and the Transition from Colony to Republic, 1780–1840 (Duke University Press, 1999), which was translated into Spanish as De Túpac Amaru a Gamarra: Cuzco y la creación del Perú republicano (Centro Bartolomé de Las Casas, 3 editions).

In 2008, he published Shaky Colonialism: The 1746 Earthquake-Tsunami in Lima, Peru and its Long Aftermath (Duke University Press 2008), which according to one reviewer is "a brilliant discussion into how natural disasters affect not only the psyche of the inhabitants but also the manner in which social spaces and interactions are rethought with an eye toward achieving social order and control." The book was translated into Spanish as Colonialismo en ruinas: Lima frente al terremoto y tsunami de 1746 (Instituto de Estudios Peruanos & IFEA, 2012).

In 2014, he published The Tupac Amaru Rebellion (Harvard University Press, 2014), a narrative history of the uprising (1780–83).  The Tupac Amaru Rebellion earned the 2015 Norris and Carol Hundley Award, given by the Pacific Coast Branch of the American Historical Association.The Financial Times named it one of the best books of history in 2014.

In September 2020, Oxford University Press published his graphic history, Witness to the Age of Revolution: The Odyssey of Juan Bautista Tupac Amaru (Liz Clarke, artist).  Also in 2020, he published with Carlos Aguirre a book on the Peruvian socialist thinker Alberto Flores Galindo, Alberto Flores Galindo: Utopía, historia y revolución (La Siniestra Ensayos).  In early 2021, Duke University Press will release the translation, with Michael Lazzara, of José Carlos Agüero, Surrendered: Reflections by the Son of Shining Path. The volume contains the translation of the original text as well as an extensive interview conducted by Lazzara and Walker.  In 2017, he published The Lima Reader: History, Culture, Politics with Carlos Aguirre (Duke University Press).

He has also coedited several volumes in Peru, including a collection of his essays, Diálogos con el Perú (FEP San Marcos, 2009). He was co-translator (with Carlos Aguirre and Willie Hiatt) of  Alberto Flores Galindo’s Buscando un Inca/In Search of an Inca (Cambridge University Press, 2010). His article, "When Fear Rather than Reason Dominates: Priests Behind the Lines in the Tupac Amaru Rebellion (1780–1783)," won the José María Arguedas Prize from the Peru section in Latin American Studies Association (LASA) 2013.In 2013, he was named Honorary Professor, History Department, Universidad Nacional San Antonio Abad del Cuzco.

Other work 

Walker served on the Executive Council of the Latin American Studies Association as well as editorial boards in Chile, Peru, Spain, and the United States. He is the Andes editor for the Oxford Research Encyclopedia of Latin American History. For 2021, he received a Modern Endangered Archives Program Fellowship (UCLA) for the Digitization of the Confederación Campesina del Perú (CCP) Archive. He served as the chief advisor for the exhibit on “Túpac Amaru y Micaela Bastidas: Memorias, símbolos y misterios.” LUM: Lugar de la Memoria, Lima. In recent years, he has served as an expert witness in numerous asylum cases.

References

External links 
 

Year of birth missing (living people)
Living people
21st-century American historians
21st-century American male writers
University of California, Davis faculty
Historians of Latin America
Historians of Peru
Latin Americanists
University of California, Berkeley alumni
Stanford University alumni
University of Chicago alumni
American male non-fiction writers